Banham is an English village and civil parish in the county of Norfolk, about  north of Diss,  east of Thetford and  south-west of Norwich. It is home to Banham Zoo, a private collection open to the public for more than 40 years, which houses over 2000 animals. The Church of England parish church, dedicated to St Mary the Virgin, is a Grade I listed building. The name of the village derives from "Bean homestead/village", or perhaps "hemmed-in land where beans grow".

Population and governance
The civil parish has an area of 16.17 km2 and in the 2001 census had a population of 1,443 in 573 households, including for census purposes the neighbouring village of Fersfield. This increased to a population of 1,481 in 603 households at the 2011 Census. For local government, the parish lies in the district of Breckland. Since 2015, the parish has formed part of The Buckenhams and Banham ward, which returns one councillor to the district council.

Schools
Acorn Park School is a registered children's home and school for children and young people with autistic spectrum disorders and is part of the Acorn Care and Education Group.

Banham Marshalls College, an independent school in the village, was subject to Norfolk's biggest ever child-cruelty investigation, along with another school in Banham which was known as The Old Rectory School.

As a result of the investigation into the schools, which were for children with special needs and ostensibly specialised in Emotional and Behavioural Disorders, the proprietor of each and former head teacher, George Robson, received a two-year suspended prison sentence. George Robson died the day after his sentencing.

The charges were brought by ex-pupils of the school dating as far back as 1976. Most of the charges related to The Old Rectory School, although some children from Banham Marshalls College had made complaints, some of which resulted in the conviction of David Clarke. Robson's brother, Anthony, was also sentenced for crimes committed at The Old Rectory School.

Robert Wilson, a teacher and later principal, was likewise convicted of acts of cruelty involving vulnerable children, but was cleared on appeal on the basis that the judge had made an error in his summing-up. Given that the evidence was not consistent and the judge had misled the jury, the conviction was deemed to be unsafe.

Banham Marshalls College was closed down by the government Department of Education in 2003. The site is now occupied by Acorn Park School, which has no connection with the former Banham Marshalls College.

Notable people
The village was the birthplace on 17 April 1795 of the schoolteacher, writer, poet and hymn writer Emily Taylor.

The Rev. Edward Thomas Daniell of the Norwich School of painters, a talented amateur etcher and painter, was curate of St Mary's for 18 months, from 1832.

War Memorial
Banham's War Memorial is located on the Village Green and holds the names of forty eight of the fallen and it was unveiled in 1920 by the Earl of Albemarle, then Honorary Colonel of the 4th Battalion Royal Norfolk Regiment. It holds the following names for the First World War:
 Company Sergeant-Major Daniel J. Bowen (1889-1917), 4th Battalion, Royal Norfolk Regiment
 Lance-Sergeant Harrold G. Hunt (1886-1914), 1st Battalion, Grenadier Guards
 Lance-Corporal Richard Chapman (1884-1916), 1st Battalion, Essex Regiment
 Bugler Christopher J. Kemp (d.1915), 4th Battalion, Rifle Brigade (The Prince Consort's Own)
 Driver Ernest Chapman (1878-1916), Royal Army Service Corps
 Pioneer Arthur H. Bush (1874-1919), 271st Railway Company, Royal Engineers
 Gunner John A. Turvey (1898-1917), 84th Battery, Royal Field Artillery
 Rifleman Albert V. Rout (d.1918), 8th Battalion, King's Royal Rifle Corps
 Private Charles E. Ribbons (1889-1917), 4th Battalion, Bedfordshire Regiment
 Private J. Sydney Buttle (d.1918), 7th Battalion, Bedfordshire Regiment
 Private James G. Cracknell (d.1916), 9th Battalion, Cheshire Regiment
 Private Fred C. Hunt (1888-1916), 1st Battalion, Coldstream Guards
 Private Thomas J. Turvey (d.1917), 3rd Battalion, Coldstream Guards
 Private Stanley Stainer (1889-1917), 7th Battalion, East Surrey Regiment
 Private William G. Roberts (d.1915), 1st Battalion, Essex Regiment
 Private Frederick Tite (1887-1917), 2nd Battalion, Essex Regiment
 Private Herbert Morley (d.1916), 6th Battalion, Essex Regiment
 Private Benjamin S. Smith (d.1917), 11th (City of London) Battalion, Royal Fusiliers
 Private Edgar C. Riches (1897-1916), 1st Battalion, Grenadier Guards
 Private Walter G. Lanchester (d.1918), 46th Company, Machine Gun Corps
 Private James H. Scarfe (d.1917), 273rd Company, Machine Gun Corps
 Private H. Frederick C. Taylor (1883-1918), Royal Marine Engineers
 Private Ernest W. Morley (1890-1916), 1st Battalion, Royal Norfolk Regiment
 Private Ernest Tite (d.1915), 2nd Battalion, Royal Norfolk Regiment
 Private Ernest J. Blackburn (d.1916), 7th Battalion, Royal Norfolk Regiment
 Private John R. Fulcher (1895-1916), 7th Battalion, Royal Norfolk Regiment
 Private Nelson G. Stevenson (1894-1915), 7th Battalion, Royal Norfolk Regiment
 Private Edward J. Dunning (d.1917), 8th Battalion, Royal Norfolk Regiment
 Private Charles Rudd (1896-1916), 9th Battalion, Royal Norfolk Regiment
 Private Rudolph Saunders (d.1916), 9th Battalion, Royal Norfolk Regiment
 Private William Saunders (1892-1917), 9th Battalion, Royal Norfolk Regiment
 Private Charles H. Sharpe (d.1918), 9th Battalion, Royal Norfolk Regiment
 Private Edward Wake (1892-1915), 9th Battalion, Royal Norfolk Regiment
 Private Leonard F. Brewster (1898-1918), Norfolk Yeomanry
 Private William Harvey (1897-1917), 6th Battalion, Northamptonshire Regiment
 Private Sydney G. Lyng, 11th Battalion, Royal Tank Corps
 Private George E. Knights (1898-1917), 6th Battalion, Royal Warwickshire Regiment
 Private Edward A. J. Peck (1895-1918), 10th Battalion, Queen's Royal Regiment (West Surrey)
 George D. Kemp
 William Wright

And, the following for the Second World War:
 Corporal Arthur Smith (1914-1941), 8th Battalion, Royal Tank Regiment
 Able-Seaman Eric Bangay (d.1939), HMS Duchess (H64)
 Able-Seaman Edwin G. Saunders (1921-1940), HMS Kent (54)
 Marine Herbert W. Hansell (1903-1942), HMS Erebus (I02)
 Guardsman Edgar C. Wake (1923-1943), 5th Battalion, Grenadier Guards
 Private Wilfred Peacock (1924-1944), 1st Battalion, East Surrey Regiment
 Private Charles C. Robinson (1924-1945), 2nd Battalion, Essex Regiment
 Private Charles A. Weeds (d.1943), 2nd Battalion, Loyal Regiment (North Lancashire)

References

External links

Information from Genuki Norfolk on Banham

Map of Banham

Bibliography
 

Villages in Norfolk
Civil parishes in Norfolk
Breckland District